Dimitri Poliakov was the defending champion, but did not compete this year.

Thomas Muster won the title by defeating Franco Davín 6–1, 4–6, 6–4 in the final.

Seeds

Draw

Finals

Top half

Bottom half

References

External links
 Official results archove (ATP)
 Official results archive (ITF)

Croatia Open - Singles
1992 Singles
1992 in Croatian tennis